Lee Jae-jin (Hangul: 이재진; ; born 26 January 1983) is a badminton player from South Korea.

Career
In 2003, he won the Hungarian International tournament in the mixed doubles event, and at the Norwegian International he won doubles title in the men's and mixed doubles event. In 2005, he won the mixed doubles title at the South Korea, German, Thailand, and Malaysia Open with Lee Hyo-jung. In Thailand, he also won the men's doubles title with Jung Jae-sung.

Lee played at the 2007 BWF World Championships in men's doubles with Hwang Ji-man. They were seeded tenth and were defeated in the third round by Candra Wijaya and Tony Gunawan, 21-17, 21-16.

In Beijing 2008 Summer Olympics, Lee and his partner Hwang won the first bronze medal after upsetting Choong Tan Fook/Lee Wan Wah in the first round and Tadashi Ohtsuka/Keita Masuda in the quarter-final, but were defeated by Cai Yun and Fu Haifeng of China in the semi-final. Nevertheless, in the bronze medal match, Lee and Hwang subdued Danish pair Lars Paaske and Jonas Rasmussen.

In 2011, Lee was back in the Korean mainstream press after winning the pro match at the national pro-boxing New King Challenge.

Achievements

Olympic Games 
Men's doubles

Asian Championships 
Men's doubles

Mixed doubles

World Junior Championships 
Mixed doubles

Asian Junior Championships 
Boys' doubles

Mixed doubles

BWF Superseries  
The BWF Superseries, launched on 14 December 2006 and implemented in 2007, is a series of elite badminton tournaments, sanctioned by Badminton World Federation (BWF). BWF Superseries has two level such as Superseries and Superseries Premier. A season of Superseries features twelve tournaments around the world, which introduced since 2011, with successful players invited to the Superseries Finals held at the year end.

Men's doubles

 BWF Superseries tournament

BWF Grand Prix 
The BWF Grand Prix has two level such as Grand Prix and Grand Prix Gold. It is a series of badminton tournaments, sanctioned by Badminton World Federation (BWF) since 2007. The World Badminton Grand Prix sanctioned by International Badminton Federation since 1983.

Men's doubles

Mixed doubles

 BWF Grand Prix Gold tournament
 BWF & IBF tournament

BWF International Challenge/Series 
Men's doubles

Mixed doubles

 BWF International Challenge tournament
 BWF International Series tournament

References

External links

 BWF Player Profile

1983 births
Living people
People from Miryang
South Korean male badminton players
Badminton players at the 2008 Summer Olympics
Olympic badminton players of South Korea
Olympic bronze medalists for South Korea
Olympic medalists in badminton
Medalists at the 2008 Summer Olympics
Badminton players at the 2002 Asian Games
Badminton players at the 2006 Asian Games
Asian Games gold medalists for South Korea
Asian Games silver medalists for South Korea
Asian Games medalists in badminton
Medalists at the 2002 Asian Games
Medalists at the 2006 Asian Games
Sportspeople from South Gyeongsang Province